Rough is Tina Turner's third solo studio album, released in September 1978 on the EMI label in the UK, Ariola Records in West Germany, and United Artists Records in the United States. This is Turner's first solo album released after her divorce from husband Ike Turner in 1978. Her first two solo albums, Tina Turns the Country On! (1974) and Acid Queen (1975), were released while she was still a member of the Ike & Tina Turner Revue. Although Rough received positive critical reception, it was not a commercial success.

Songs
Rough is made up of mostly blues and disco cover songs with a rock influence. Just like the preceding Acid Queen, the album was an indication that Turner wanted to take her music into a rock-oriented direction.

The opening track, "Fruits of the Night," was co-written by Giorgio Moroder's longtime collaborator Pete Bellotte. Turner recorded a cover of Bob Seger's "Fire Down Below." The album also includes Turner's first cover version of Elton John's "The Bitch Is Back," which she re-recorded in 1991 for the tribute album Two Rooms: Celebrating the Songs of Elton John & Bernie Taupin.

"Viva La Money" was the only single released in the United States. Three additional singles were released in Europe: "Root Toot, Undisputable Rock & Roller," "Sometimes When We Touch," and "Fruits of the Night." None of the singles had chart success.

Critical reception 
Billboard reviewed the album as an "adventurous variety of old and new material," adding that Turner's "delivery has lost none of its snap and crackle."

Cash Box wrote that "she rocks rough and randy enough to make her pop and soul competitors quiver in their lizard skin tennis shoes. Turner mixes the intensity of the gospel choir with the promised pleasures of the turned-down bed to great effect."

Record World noted, "Turner's sassy vocals are always something to behold and her newest lp is certainly no exception."

Joel Vance of Stereo Review wrote that "one hearing of 'The Bitch Is Back', 'Night Time Is the Right Time', 'Fire Down Below', or 'Root, Toot Undisputable Rock 'n Roller' will convince you that if Tina temporarily abdicated as the queen of steamy soul, she has now reclaimed her throne with a sweet vengeance."

Reissues 
The album was re-issued on CD by EMI in the early 1990s but is currently out of print.

Track listing

Personnel
Rick Kellis – horn, saxophone, strings, horn arrangements
Ken Moore – piano, background vocals
Airto Moreira – percussion
Dennis Belfield – bass guitar
Michael Boddicker – synthesizer
Peter Bunetta, Ed Greene – drums
Al Ciner – acoustic guitar
Denise Echols – background vocals
Venetta Fields – background vocals
Billy Haynes – bass guitar
Maxayn Lewis – background vocals
Deborah Lindsey – background vocals
Lenny Macaluso – electric guitar
Bill Oz – harmonica
Mary Russell – background vocals
Julia Tillman Waters – background vocals 
Stephanie Spruill – background vocals
Michael Stephenson – background vocals
Ron Stockert – synthesizer, clavinet
Marsha Thacker – background vocals
Tony Walthers – background vocals
Jeff "Dino" Deane, Dennis Farias – horn
William "Smitty" Smith – Hammond organ
The L.A. Horns – horns
The Gerald Lee String Company – strings
Jill Harris – assistant producer
Claude Mougin – photography

References

Tina Turner albums
1978 albums
United Artists Records albums
Disco albums by American artists
Blues rock albums by American artists
EMI Records albums
Ariola Records albums